Warning is a 2013 Hindi adventure thriller 3D film directed by Gurmmeet Singh and produced by Anubhav Sinha and Jitendra Jain. The film was released on 27 September 2013 and features Madhurima Tuli, Santosh Barmola, Suzana Rodrigues and Manjari Fadnis as main characters.

The film is a remake of the 2006 film Open Water 2: Adrift.

Cast

Santosh Barmola - Taranjit Singh Bakshi
Madhurima Tuli- Gunjan Dutta
Manjari Fadnis - Sabina Sanyal
Varun Sharma - Anshul Pandey
Jitin Gulati - Deepak Sharma
Sumit Suri - Aman Puri
Suzana Rodrigues- Jeanine
James (Nagar Baul)

Soundtrack
The music was composed by Toshi Sabri, Meet Bros, John Stewart  and released by Sony Music India.

References

External links
 

2010s Hindi-language films
Indian thriller films
2013 films
Films shot in Fiji
Indian remakes of American films
2013 thriller films
Hindi-language thriller films
Films about sharks
Films about shark attacks